There are two different kinds of swimming records in the United States and certified by USA Swimming:
USA record, more commonly referred to in the US as the American record: the fastest time by an American swimmer.
US Open record: The fastest time within the United States.

Note: The USA record (or American record) should not be confused with the Americas records, which are the fastest times ever swum by a swimmer representing any country of the Americas.

An asterisk (*) indicates that this record has been achieved since the latest USA Swimming records publication. A plus (+) indicates that this record also is the current world record.

Long course (50 m)

Men

Women

Short course meters (25 m)

Men

Women

Short course yards (25 yd)

Men

Women

See also
World records in swimming
List of Americas records in swimming (continental records)

Notes
[a] The USA Record, or "American Record", represents the fastest time swum by a United States citizen in any geographic location, provided that they are "U.S. Sports Citizens who achieve an official time in accordance with USA Swimming rules."  (USA Swimming Rules 104.2.2(A)(1)). NOTE: Portions of this rule were changed in September 2008 so that only swimmers who are representing the USA at the time of the swim, or capable of representing the USA, are eligible. This follows Mike Alexandrov's setting of the American Record in the 100 yd breaststroke at a time when he was swimming internationally for Bulgaria.
[b] This record represents the fastest time swum by anyone within the geographic territory of the United States, provided that the person is "eligible to compete under and achieving an official time in accordance with USA Swimming rules." (USA Swimming Rules 104.2.2(A)(2)). Prior to 1985, this record included the fastest time swum by any United States citizen anywhere, but from 1985-on US Open Records may not be attained in this manner. However, any remaining old records are valid until they are bettered. (This record should not be confused with the US Open Meet Record, which is the fastest time swum at the US Open meet.)
[d] A team representing the USA swam a time of 3:32.48 at the 2010 Pan Pacific Swimming Championships on August 21, 2010, but the record has not been recognized by USA Swimming.  The team consisted of Aaron Peirsol-53.91, Mark Gangloff-1:00.45, Michael Phelps-50.58, and Nathan Adrian-47.54.
[e] For the US Open Record in the men's long course 200 IM, Ryan Lochte swam under the listed record of 1:54.56 at the 2010 Pan Pacs, winning the event in 1:54.43; however, the time has not been recognized as the record.
[f] For the SCM women's 200 free American Record, Allison Schmitt swam a faster time at the 2009 Duel in the Pool (1:51.67); however, the time has not been recognized as a record by USA Swimming.
[g] For the SCM women's 400 IM American Record, Julia Smit at the 2009 Duel in the Pool set a then-World Record of 4:21.04; however, this time has not been recognized as the American Record by USA Swimming.

References

Rule Book Records as of March 24, 2012

External links
USA Swimming Records & Rankings at official website

United States

Swimming
Swimming